Honda Yasutoshi may refer to:

Honda Yasutoshi (1569–1621), daimyō of Zeze Domain 1617 - 1621
Honda Yasutoshi (1693–1747), daimyō of Zeze Domain 1719 - 1747

See also
Honda clan